Anyanwu (anyaanwū, meaning "eye of the sun" in Igbo) is an Igbo solar deity and a surname given to people of the Igbo people of Nigeria.

Anyanwu is also the name given to a major character in the Octavia E. Butler's Patternist series.

Anyanwu is also the name attributed to the "Spirit Face" (who is assertive) of Sunny Nwazue in Akata Witch and Akata Warrior by Nnedi Okorafor.

See also
 List of solar deities

References

Igbo religion